The Lion and the Lamb is a 1931 American Pre-Code comedy thriller film directed by George B. Seitz and starring Walter Byron, Carmel Myers and Raymond Hatton. It is an adaptation of the 1930 novel of the same title by E. Phillips Oppenheim.

Synopsis
In London a young man who has recently inherited a title as an Earl encounters a notorious gang known as the Lambs and is blackmailed into joining them due to his fingerprints on a knife used to kill an alleged traitor to the gang.

Cast

 Walter Byron as Dave
 Carmel Myers as Inez
 Raymond Hatton as Muggsy
 Montagu Love as Professor Tottie
 Miriam Seegar as Madge
 Charles K. Gerrard as Bert 
 Will Stanton as Ruebin
 Charles Wildish as First Lascar
 Harry Semels as Second Lascar
 Robert Milasch as Lem
 Yorke Sherwood as Wister
 Sidney Bracey as Stanton

References

Bibliography
 Goble, Alan. The Complete Index to Literary Sources in Film. Walter de Gruyter, 1999.

External links

1931 films
1931 comedy films
1930s comedy thriller films
American comedy thriller films
American black-and-white films
Films based on works by E. Phillips Oppenheim
Films directed by George B. Seitz
Columbia Pictures films
Films based on British novels
Films set in London
1930s American films